The 1958 United States Senate election in Tennessee was held on November 4, 1958. Democrat Albert Gore Sr. was re-elected to a second term. Gore survived a primary challenge from former Governor Prentice Cooper and easily defeated Republican Hobart Atkins in the general election.

Democratic primary

Candidates
Prentice Cooper, former Governor of Tennessee and U.S. Ambassador to Peru
Albert Gore Sr., incumbent U.S. Senator since 1953
Robert C. Gregory

Results

General election

Candidates
Hobart F. Atkins, nominee for Senate in 1952 (Republican)
Albert Gore Sr., incumbent Senator since 1953 (Democratic)
Thomas Gouge (Wheat in Bread)
Chester W. Mason (Independent)

Results

See also
1958 United States Senate elections

References

1958
Tennessee
United States Senate